is a Japanese game designer, director and producer, most known for being a creator of the Animal Crossing series. 

He was born in 1965 in Tokyo, Japan and grew up in Chiba Prefecture. He began work at Nintendo in 1986 and spent some time doing promotional artwork before starting as a designer on Super Mario Bros. 3. He first served as director for Star Fox in 1993. Other games he has directed include Super Mario World, Star Fox 2, Wave Race 64, and Yoshi's Story.

Eguchi served as a senior producer of his own EAD software development group, but currently serves as the Deputy General Manager of Nintendo's Entertainment Planning & Development division.

After Nintendo's acquisition of SRD Co.Ltd (System Research and Development) in 2022, Eguchi was chosen to be the Nintendo representative at the group as part of the board of directors of the company.

Work on Animal Crossing

Eguchi is credited with the creation of the Animal Crossing series. Mental Floss writes that "Animal Crossing was inspired by Eguchi’s experiences...when he was a 21 year-old graduate who’d taken the decisive step of moving from Chiba, where he’d grown up and studied, to Nintendo’s HQ in Kyoto." And in addition: "Eguchi wanted to recreate the feeling of being alone in a new town, away from friends and family."

In an interview with Edge, Eguchi described the beginnings of Animal Crossing:
"Animal Crossing features three themes: family, friendship and community. But the reason I wanted to investigate them was a result of being so lonely when I arrived in Kyoto! Chiba is east of Tokyo and quite a distance from Kyoto, and when I moved there I left my family and friends behind. In doing so, I realised that being close to them – being able to spend time with them, talk to them, play with them – was such a great, important thing. I wondered for a long time if there would be a way to recreate that feeling, and that was the impetus behind the original Animal Crossing."

And in an interview with Gamasutra he also described the game's role in a family like his:
"Another thing is that I'd always get home really late. And my family plays games, and would sometimes be playing when I got home. And I thought to myself – they're playing games, and I'm playing games, but we're not really doing it together. It'd be nice to have a play experience where even though we're not playing at the same time, we're still sharing things together. So this was something that the kids could play after school, and I could play when I got home at night, and I could kind of be part of what they were doing while I wasn't around. And at the same time they get to see things I've been doing. It was kind of a desire to create a space where my family and I could interact more, even if we weren't playing together."

Works

References

External links
 Iwata Asks: Wii Sports - Development Staff Interview
 Iwata Asks: Animal Crossing: City Folk - Development Staff Interview
 Iwata Asks: Wii Music - Development Staff Interview
 Iwata Asks: Wii Sports Resort - Development Staff Interview
E3 2005 interview with IGN
2006 interview with Kikizo
E3 2006 interview with IGN
E3 2006 interview with Game|Life

1965 births
Japanese video game designers
Japanese video game directors
Living people
Nintendo people
People from Chiba Prefecture
People from Tokyo